Marco Crugnola and Alessandro Motti were the defending champions, but they were eliminated by Martin Slanar and Lovro Zovko in the first round.Frank Moser and David Škoch defeated Martin Emmrich and Mateusz Kowalczyk 5–7, 7–6(2), [10–5] in the final to win the title.

Seeds

Draw

Draw

References
 Doubles Draw

Citta di Como Challenger - Doubles
Città di Como Challenger